The Brunei national under-20 futsal team is controlled by the Futsal Committee of the National Football Association of Brunei Darussalam, the governing body for futsal in Brunei, and represents the country in international futsal competitions.

Competition history

AFC U-20 Futsal Championship

Players

Current squad
The following players were called up for the 2017 AFC U-20 Futsal Championship in Thailand on 16–26 May 2017.

Results and fixtures
2017 AFC U-20 Futsal Championship

References

External links
 National Football Association of Brunei Darussalam

Asian national futsal teams
National sports teams of Brunei